Under Feet Like Ours is the debut studio album by Canadian indie pop duo Tegan and Sara. It was originally launched under "Sara and Tegan" in limited quantities in 1999, and was re-edited under "Tegan and Sara". It was re-released again in 2001 with the bonus track "Frozen" from This Business of Art. It was released for the first time on vinyl in 2017 as a Record Store Day exclusive under the original band name, Sara and Tegan.

On the cover, Sara is wearing red clothes and Tegan purple-ish ones.

Track listing

References 

1999 debut albums
Tegan and Sara albums